HSAS may refer to:

 Hagar Schon Aaronson Shrieve, a rock supergroup from California
 Homeland Security Advisory System, an American color-coded terrorism threat advisory scale
 Hydrocephalus, a congenital disorder colloquially known as 'water on the brain'
 High School of American Studies, a specialized public high school in Bronx, New York

See also
 HSA (disambiguation)